Pie-IX Boulevard (pronounced  in both English and French), named after Pope Pius IX, is a major boulevard in Montreal, Quebec, Canada. Pie-IX Boulevard runs past the Montreal Botanical Gardens and the Olympic Stadium. The boulevard forms part of Quebec Route 125.

It traverses the boroughs of Mercier–Hochelaga-Maisonneuve, Rosemont–La Petite-Patrie, Villeray–Saint-Michel–Parc-Extension and Montréal-Nord.

Transit
Pie-IX metro station is located on and named for the street.

The boulevard is serviced by the 139 Pie-IX regular service bus, and the reserved bus lane 439 rush hour bus.

The Montréal-Nord commuter rail station is located on Pie-IX Boulevard.

Pie-IX BRT 
After an initial attempt in the 1990s, a Bus rapid transit (BRT) opened on November 7, 2022. Currently, the BRT runs from Saint-Martin in Laval to Pie-IX and Mont-Royal in Rosemont-La-Petite-Patrie. The Jean-Talon and Bélanger stations are under construction that includes a transfer to a new unnamed station on  the Blue Line.

See also 
 Pie IX Bridge

References

Streets in Montreal
Mercier–Hochelaga-Maisonneuve
Rosemont–La Petite-Patrie
Villeray–Saint-Michel–Parc-Extension
Montréal-Nord